The Diving events at the 2015 European Games took place at the Baku Aquatics Centre, Baku from 18 to 21 June 2015. Eight events were contested, six from the Olympic program, 3 metre and 3 metre synchronised springboard, and platform for both men and women. In addition, two non-Olympic events, men's and women's 1m springboard, were be held. The Olympic events of men's and women's 10 metre synchronised diving were not held.

Diving was not included in the earliest list of sports confirmed for the 2015 Games, as the European swimming authorities at that stage were minded not to take part. However, following negotiations with the organising authorities, a compromise was reached whereby, in 2015, these events were for junior divers only - in effect, athletes between the ages of 14 and 18.

Qualification

160 divers are expected to take part. National Olympic Committees will be restricted to one entry in each synchronised event, and two entries in each individual event. As host, Azerbaijan is entitled to a minimum one diver.

Following the European Junior Diving Championships in July 2014 (Bergamo, Italy), LEN will confirm the quotas per nation and  based on an average ranking by NOC from the last three European Junior Diving Championships.

Timetable

Participating Countries 
The number beside each nation represents the number of athletes who will compete for each country at the 2015 European Games.

Medal table

Medalists

Men's

Women's

References

 
Sports at the 2015 European Games
European Games
2015